The C-3 is a line and rail service of Cercanías Madrid commuter rail network, operated by Renfe Operadora. It runs from El Escorial northwest of Madrid to Aranjuez south of Madrid. The line has been in operation since 1980, with its current incarnation in operation since 22 September 2011.

On 5 November 2018, the C-3a service was introduced as a separation of former extended C-3 services terminating at either El Escorial or Santa María de la Alameda. The C-3a designation was formerly used for the now-closed Pinto–San Martín de la Vega branch line (es:Línea Pinto-San Martín de la Vega) branching off from Pinto to Parque Warner Madrid and San Martín de la Vega, which operated between 2002 and 2012.

List of stations
The following table lists the name of each station served by line C-3 in order from northwest to south; the station's service pattern offered by C-3 trains; the transfers to other Cercanías Madrid lines; remarkable transfers to other transport systems; the municipality in which each station is located; and the fare zone each station belongs to according to the Madrid Metro fare zone system.

References

Cercanías Madrid